Romaric Rogombé (born 25 November 1990) is a Gabonese professional footballer who currently plays as a forward. At the moment he plays for AC Léopards in the Congo Premier League.

Honours 
AS Vita Club
Runner-up
 Linafoot: 2012

Honours
1°de agosto
Girabola: 2016

External links 
 

1990 births
Living people
Gabonese footballers
Gabon international footballers
2015 Africa Cup of Nations players
AS Vita Club players
ÉFC Fréjus Saint-Raphaël players
AC Léopards players
AS Mangasport players
C.D. Primeiro de Agosto players
Sportspeople from Libreville
Association football forwards
21st-century Gabonese people